Chen Tang (born 16 February 1996) is a Chinese footballer who plays as midfielder for Hefei City.

Club career
Chen Tang was promoted to Chinese Super League side Hebei China Fortune first team squad by manager Manuel Pellegrini in the summer of 2017. He made his senior debut on 26 August 2018 in a 2–2 away draw against Changchun Yatai, coming on as a substitute for Gao Huaze in the 78th minute.

Career statistics
.

References

External links
 

1996 births
Chinese footballers
Footballers from Shenyang
Hebei F.C. players
Chinese Super League players
Living people
Association football midfielders